is a Japanese actor and voice actor currently affliated with Trans World Japan. He debuted as an actor in 2005 and as a voice actor in 2016. Tsuchiya is best known for portraying Tsutomu Goshiki in Haikyū!! and Tatara Fujita in Welcome to the Ballroom. As an actor, he is best known for his role of Toshio Saeki in the 2009 horror film, The Grudge 3. He has two older sisters; Honoka, a model, and Tao Tsuchiya, also an actress.

Filmography

Anime 
2016
Haikyū!! as Tsutomu Goshiki

2017
The Dragon Dentist 
Welcome to the Ballroom as Tatara Fujita

2018
Beatless as Student C, Soldier A
Sanrio Boys as Various roles
Working Buddies! as Belugamine-senpai

2019
Midnight Occult Civil Servants as Tarobo
O Maidens in Your Savage Season as Izumi Norimoto

2021
Farewell, My Dear Cramer as Yasuaki Tani
Backflip!! as Shōtarō Futaba
The Aquatope on White Sand as Kai Nakamura

2022
Police in a Pod as Takeshi Yamada
Fanfare of Adolescence as Shun Kazanami
Love All Play as Hirohito Monda
Shoot! Goal to the Future as Kōhei Kokubo

2023
In/Spectre 2nd Season as Kazuyuki Konno
Ao no Orchestra as Nao Saeki

Video games 
Welcome to the Ballroom (2017) as Tatara Fujita
Idol Fantasy (2018) as Daiga Hashizume
Disney: Twisted-Wonderland (2020) as Epel Felmier
Angelique Luminarise (2021) as Yue

Theatrical animation 
K: Seven Stories (2018) as Takeru Kusuhara
Sound! Euphonium The Movie - Our Promise: A Brand New Day (2019) as Motomu Tsukinaga
Burn the Witch (2020) as Balgo Parks
Farewell, My Dear Cramer: First Touch (2021) as Yasuaki Tani
Backflip!! (2022) as Shōtarō Futaba

Dubbing 
Supah Ninjas (2012) as Flint Forster (Cody Christian)
Hawaii Five-0 (2018) as Reese Holland (Joey Luthman)
Pacific Rim: Uprising (2018) as Tahima (Rahart Adams)
Bumblebee (2019) as Tripp Summers (Ricardo Hoyos)

Movies 
Gunjō (2009)
Pedal no Yukue (2009) 
The Grudge 3 (2009) as Toshio Saeki

Television drama
 Ryōmaden (2010)
 Tokusatsu Gagaga (2019) as Shishi Leo (voice)
 Aikatsu Planet! (2021)
 Ultraman Trigger: New Generation Tiga (2021) as Ribut

References

External links 
 Official agency website 

1996 births
Living people
Japanese male child actors
Japanese male video game actors
Japanese male voice actors
Male voice actors from Tokyo
21st-century Japanese male actors